The Central District of Firuzeh County is a district (bakhsh) in Firuzeh County, Razavi Khorasan province, Iran. At the 2006 census, its population was 27,261, in 6,919, families. The district has one city: Firuzeh. The district has two rural districts (dehestan): Firuzeh Rural District and Takht-e Jolgeh Rural District.

References 

Districts of Razavi Khorasan Province
Firuzeh County